The Toyota Gaia is a Japanese market MPV that competed with the Nissan Prairie, Mitsubishi Chariot and the Honda Odyssey. It was replaced by the Toyota Isis. The Gaia shares a platform with the Toyota Ipsum (sister car) and Toyota Caldina (platform sharing). It was manufactured from May 1998 until September 2004 for the Japanese market. The Gaia was sold only at Japanese dealerships called Toyopet Store next to the Corona.

April 2001 saw DVD based navigation, a precursor to Toyota's G-Book navigation system added as an option, and the 3S-FE engine was upgraded to the 1AZ-FSE with AWD. The 1AZ-FSE features Toyota's D-4 direct injection system.

The vehicle was named for Gaia; the primal Greek goddess personifying the Earth.

External links 
Gaia specs at amayama.com
GAZOO.com Toyota Gaia (Japanese)

2000s cars
All-wheel-drive vehicles
Cars introduced in 1998
Front-wheel-drive vehicles
Minivans
Gaia